Casey Field is baseball ballpark located in Covington, Virginia. Games were first played there in 1962. The park served as the home of the Covington Red Sox in 1967 and the Covington Astros from 1968 to 1976. The field is currently home of the Covington Lumberjacks of the Valley Baseball League.

Casey Field also hosts football games.

References

Sports venues in Virginia